Nalliers may refer to two communes in France:
 Nalliers, Vendée, in the Pays-de-la-Loire region
 Nalliers, Vienne, in the Poitou-Charentes region